The House of Aisin-Gioro was a Manchu clan that ruled the Later Jin dynasty (1616–1636), the Qing dynasty (1636–1912), and Manchukuo (1932–1945) in the history of China. Under the Ming dynasty, members of the Aisin Gioro clan served as chiefs of the Jianzhou Jurchens, one of the three major Jurchen tribes at this time. Qing bannermen passed through the gates of the Great Wall in 1644, conquered the short-lived Shun dynasty and the Southern Ming dynasty. The Qing dynasty later expanded into other adjacent regions, including Xinjiang, Tibet, Outer Mongolia, and Taiwan, gaining total control of China. The dynasty reached its zenith during the High Qing era and under the Qianlong Emperor, who reigned from 1735 to 1796. This reign was followed by a century of gradual decline.

The house lost power in 1912 following the Xinhai Revolution. Puyi, the last Aisin-Gioro emperor, nominally maintained his imperial title in the Forbidden City until the Articles of Favourable Treatment were revoked by Feng Yuxiang in 1924. The Qing was China's last orthodox imperial dynasty.

Etymology

Aisin means "gold." It corresponds to "Jin" (金) in Chinese. Gioro is the surname, which refers to the clan's ancestral home in today Yilan County, Heilongjiang. Following the fall of the Qing Empire, most members of the clan have changed their surnames to Han Chinese surnames such as Jin, Zhao, Ai, Luo, Bai, Hai.

For example, one of the heads of the Aisin-Gioro clan adopted the Han Chinese name Jin Youzhi.

Heads of the House 
The Aisin-Gioro House had no system of automatic succession such as primogeniture or a law of succession. Instead, an emperor would name an heir in a secret edict. The edict would be read before senior members of the clan following the emperor's death. An emperor could have numerous sons by women of various ranks. In 1912, the Qing dynasty was overthrown and China was declared a republic. Puyi, the last emperor, was granted the right to maintain his imperial title in the Forbidden City until 1924, when the Articles of Favorable Treatment were revoked. He went to Changchun in northeastern China to serve as chief executive (1932–1934) and later emperor (1934–1945) of Manchukuo, a puppet state of Japan.

The more recent heads of the house are given according to a succession law approved by Puyi in 1937. This follows the practice of relevant news reports and reference works. The law provided for father-to-son succession. Brothers may succeed in the absence of male issue. As a full brother, Pujie had precedence over half brother Jin Youzhi.

Family Tree 

 Min-ning, the Daoguang emperor (1782-1850)
 Yizhu, the Xianfeng emperor (1831-1861)
  Zaichun, the Tongzhi emperor (1856-1875)  
 Yixuan, 1st Prince Chun (1840-1891)
 Zaitian, the Guangxu emperor (1871-1908)
 Zaifeng, the prince-regent (1883-1951)
 Puyi, (1906-1967) the Xuantong emperor of China, emperor of Manchukuo
Pujie, head of the House of Aisin-Gioro (1907-1994)
 Puren, head of the House of Aisin-Gioro (1918-2015)
Jin Yuzhang, head of the House of Aisin-Gioro (born 1942)
(1) Jin Yuquan (金毓峑, born 1946)
(2) Jin Yulan (金毓岚, born 1948)
Zaixun, Prince Rui (1885-1949)
Pugong (1904-1969)
(3)Huang Shixiang (b. 1934)
Zaitao (1887-1949)
Pujia (1908–1979)
Pu'an (1911–1944)
Pushen (1915–1928)
Puxi (1924–1983)
(4)Pushi (b. 1940)

Origins 
The Aisin-Gioro traced its ancestry to Bukūri Yongšon, a legendary warrior of the thirteenth century. Emperor Hongtaiji claimed that Bukūri Yongšon was conceived from a virgin birth. According to the legend, three heavenly maidens, Enggulen, Jenggulen, and Fekulen, were bathing at a lake called Bulhūri Omo near the Changbai Mountains. A magpie dropped a piece of red fruit near Fekulen, who ate it. She then became pregnant with Bukūri Yongšon.

Nurgaci created the Aisin-Gioro clan as part of a reorganization of Jurchen society he initiated in 1601. His supporters were enrolled into the banner system and the population militarized. The Gioro clan was partitioned. Those descended from Taksi, Nurgaci's father, were designated Aisin (gold). Nurgaci assigned other Gioros to other clans, including Silin Gioro (Superior Gioro), Irgen Gioro (Inferior Gioro), and Tongyan Gioro (miscellaneous Gioro).

When the Jurchens were reorganized by Nurhaci into the Eight Banners, many clans were created as a group of unrelated people (mukun) using a geographic origin name such as a toponym for their hala (clan name).

The Manchu have an equally artificial origin. Although the people ruled by Aisin-Gioro were ethnically mixed, the entire population was designated as "Manchu" in 1635.

Expansion under Nurhaci and Hong Taiji

Under Nurhaci and his son Hong Taiji, the Aisin Gioro clan of the Jianzhou tribe won hegemony among the rival Jurchen tribes of the northeast, then through warfare and alliances extended its control into Inner Mongolia. Nurhachi created large, permanent civil-military units called "banners" to replace the small hunting groups used in his early campaigns. A banner was composed of smaller companies; it included some 7,500 warriors and their households, including slaves, under the command of a chieftain. Each banner was identified by a coloured flag that was yellow, white, blue, or red, either plain or with a border design. Originally there were four, then eight, Manchu banners; new banners were created as the Manchu conquered new regions, and eventually there were Manchu, Mongol, and Chinese banners, eight for each ethnic group. By 1648, less than one-sixth of the bannermen were actually of Manchu ancestry. The Qing conquest of the Ming dynasty was thus achieved with a multiethnic army led by Manchu nobles and Han Chinese generals. Han Chinese soldiers were organised into the Army of the Green Standard, which became a sort of imperial constabulary force posted throughout China and on the frontiers.

The change of the name from Jurchen to Manchu was made to hide the fact that the ancestors of the Manchus, the Jianzhou Jurchens, were ruled by the Chinese. The Qing dynasty carefully hid the 2 original editions of the books of "Qing Taizu Wu Huangdi Shilu" and the "Manzhou Shilu Tu" (Taizu Shilu Tu) in the Qing palace, forbidden from public view because they showed that the Manchu Aisin Gioro family had been ruled by the Ming dynasty. In the Ming period, the Koreans of Joseon referred to the Jurchen inhabited lands north of the Korean peninsula, above the rivers Yalu and Tumen to be part of Ming China, as the "superior country" (sangguk) which they called Ming China. The Qing deliberately excluded references and information that showed the Jurchens (Manchus) as subservient to the Ming dynasty, from the History of Ming to hide their former subservient relationship to the Ming. The Veritable Records of the Ming were not used to source content on Jurchens during Ming rule in the History of Ming because of this. This historical revisionism helped remove the accusation of rebellion from the Qing ruling family refusing to mention in the Mingshi the fact that the Qing founders were Ming China's subjects. The Qing Yongzheng Emperor attempted to rewrite the historical record and claim that the Aisin Gioro were never subjects of past dynasties and empires trying to cast Nurhaci's acceptance of Ming titles like Dragon Tiger General (longhu jiangjun 龍虎將軍) by claiming he accepted to "please Heaven".

Intermarriage and political alliances
The Qing emperors arranged marriages between Aisin Gioro noblewomen and outsiders to create political marriage alliances. During the Manchu conquest of the Ming Empire, the Manchu rulers offered to marry their princesses to Han Chinese military officers who served the Ming Empire as a means of inducing these officers into surrendering or defecting to their side. Aisin Gioro princesses were also married to Mongol princes, for the purpose of forming alliances between the Manchus and Mongol tribes.

The Manchus successfully induced one Han Chinese general, Li Yongfang (李永芳), into defecting to their side by offering him a position in the Manchu banners. Li Yongfang also married the daughter of Abatai, a son of the Qing dynasty's founder Nurhaci. Many more Han Chinese abandoned their posts in the Ming Empire and defected to the Manchu side. There were over 1,000 marriages between Han Chinese men and Manchu women in 1632 – due to a proposal by Yoto (岳托), a nephew of the Manchu emperor Hong Taiji. Hong Taiji believed that intermarriage between Han Chinese and Manchus could help to eliminate ethnic conflicts in areas already occupied by the Manchus, as well as help the Han Chinese forget their ancestral roots more easily.

Manchu noblewomen were also married to Han Chinese men who surrendered or defected to the Manchu side. Aisin Gioro women were married to the sons of the Han Chinese generals Sun Sike (孫思克), Geng Jimao, Shang Kexi and Wu Sangui. The e'fu (額駙) rank was given to husbands of Manchu princesses. Geng Zhongming, a Han bannerman, was awarded the title "Prince Jingnan", while his grandsons Geng Jingzhong, Geng Zhaozhong (耿昭忠) and Geng Juzhong (耿聚忠) married Hooge's daughter, Abatai's granddaughter, and Yolo's daughter respectively. Sun Sike's son, Sun Cheng'en (孫承恩), married the Kangxi Emperor's fourth daughter, Heshuo Princess Quejing (和硕悫靖公主).

Imperial Duke Who Assists the State (宗室輔國公) Aisin Gioro Suyan's (蘇燕) daughter was married to Han Chinese Banner General Nian Gengyao.

Genetics
Haplogroup C3b2b1*-M401(xF5483) has been identified as a possible marker of the Aisin Gioro and is found in ten different ethnic minorities in northern China, but largely absent from Han Chinese.

Genetic testing also showed that the haplogroup C3b1a3a2-F8951 of the Aisin Gioro family came to southeastern Manchuria after migrating from their place of origin in the Amur river's middle reaches, originating from ancestors related to Daurs in the Transbaikal area.  The Tungusic speaking peoples mostly have C3c-M48 as their subclade of C3 which drastically differs from the C3b1a3a2-F8951 haplogroup of the Aisin Gioro which originates from Mongolic speaking populations like the Daur. Jurchen (Manchus) are a Tungusic people. The Mongol Genghis Khan's haplogroup C3b1a3a1-F3796 (C3*-Star Cluster) is a fraternal "brother" branch of C3b1a3a2-F8951 haplogroup of the Aisin Gioro.

A genetic test was conducted on seven men who claimed Aisin Gioro descent with three of them showing documented genealogical information of all their ancestors up to Nurhaci. Three of them turned out to share the C3b2b1*-M401(xF5483) haplogroup, out of them, two of them were the ones who provided their documented family trees. The other four tested were unrelated. The Daur Ao clan carries the unique haplogroup subclade C2b1a3a2-F8951, the same haplogroup as Aisin Gioro and both Ao and Aisin Gioro only diverged merely a couple of centuries ago from a shared common ancestor. Other members of the Ao clan carry haplogroups like N1c-M178, C2a1b-F845, C2b1a3a1-F3796 and C2b1a2-M48. People from northeast China, the Daur Ao clan and Aisin Gioro clan are the main carriers of haplogroup C2b1a3a2-F8951. The Mongolic C2*-Star Cluster (C2b1a3a1-F3796) haplogroup is a fraternal branch to Aisin Gioro's C2b1a3a2-F8951 haplogroup.

Current population

There were merely 29,000 members of Aisin Gioro in 1912 when the Qing dynasty fell, in sharp contrast to the more fecund and fertile Ming dynasty before it, whose ruling House of Zhu had 200,000 (0.2 million) members by the fall of the Ming dynasty. The Manchu emperors had smaller reproduction and harems than the Ming on average and taxed Chinese peasant less than the Ming did to maintain the harem. The Ming Wanli emperor's harem's daily expenditure was more than the Qing Yongzheng emperor's harem annual expenditure. There were 6 generations of Aisin Gioro before Emperor Shunzhi's reign since Nurhaci's grandfather founded the Aisin Gioro clan. Going by the lowest estimate of tribal chief's fertility, five sons per man, Aisin Gioro's number ought to have been 3,000 or 3,125 at the start of the Qing. This meant during that China's population growth in general exactly matched the entire Qing dynasty the Aisin Gioro clan's rate of growth for male members carrying the same surname from the start of the Qing to the end of the Qing, which was growth by a factor of 10 from the initial number at the beginning of the Qing dynasty. And it was only two time's China's general population's growth rate when it included non-male line descendants of the Qing imperial family via Aisin Gioro females who did not pass the family name to their descendants. The Ming imperial Zhu family had more than 80,000 people by 1604, 62,000 in 1594, 28,492 in 1569, 28,840 in 1562, 19,611 in 1553, 2,495 in 1506–1521, 127 in 1403–1424 and 58 in 1368–1398. The Empresses of the Qing were very infertile and most often when an emperor died, there was no son of the empress alive. The Xianfeng Emperor had only one son surviving, the Tongzhi emperor. The Guangxu emperor and Tongzhi emperor both had no children. In 1660 the core branch of Aisin Gioro had 378 people while in 1915 it had 29,292 people.

Approximately 300,000 to 400,000 ethnic Manchus in China are surnamed Aisin-Gioro (愛新覺羅), while an additional 3.8 million people are surnamed Jin (金), the most common Sinicized form, which has been embraced by core imperial family members like Jin Yuzhang. This gives an upper limit of 4.2 million people who could potentially be patrilineal descendants of Nurhaci, but this figure must be used with caution as there are non-Manchu ethnic groups (notably Koreans) who also use the surname Jin (Kim) for unrelated reasons.

Notable members

Iron-cap princes and their descendants

According to Qing dynasty imperial tradition, the sons of princes do not automatically inherit their fathers' titles in the same rank as their fathers. For example, Yongqi held the title "Prince Rong of the First Rank", but when his title was passed on to his son, Mianyi, it became "Prince Rong of the Second Rank". In other words, the title gets diminished by one rank as it is passed down to each subsequent generation, but generally to no lower than the rank of kesi-be tuwakiyara gurun-de aisilara gung (second class imperial duke). However, there were 12 princes who were awarded the shi xi wang ti (perpetual heritability, a.k.a. "iron-cap") privilege, which meant that their titles can be passed on to subsequent generations without the downgrading effect.

The 12 "iron-cap" princely peerages are listed as follows. Some of them were renamed at different points in time, hence they had multiple names.

 Prince Zheng / Prince Jian, the line of Jirgalang (1599–1655), descendant of Taksi
 Prince Li / Prince Xun / Prince Kang, the line of Daišan (1583–1648), descendant of Nurhaci
 Prince Keqin / Prince Cheng / Prince Ping / Prince Yanxi, the line of Yoto (1599–1639), descendant of Nurhaci
 Prince Shuncheng, the line of Lekdehun (1619–1652), descendant of Nurhaci
 Prince Rui, the line of Dorgon (1612–1650), descendant of Nurhaci
 Prince Yu, the line of Dodo (1614–1649), descendant of Nurhaci
 Prince Su / Prince Xian, the line of Hooge (1609–1648), descendant of Hong Taiji
 Prince Chengze / Prince Zhuang, the line of Šose (1629–1655), descendant of Hong Taiji
 Prince Yi, the line of Yinxiang (1686–1730), descendant of Kangxi Emperor
 Prince Qing, the line of Yikuang (1838–1917), descendant of Qianlong Emperor
 Prince Gong, the line of Yixin (1833–1898), descendant of Daoguang Emperor
 Prince Chun, the line of Yixuan (1840–1891), descendant of Daoguang Emperor

Prominent political figures
 Daišan (1583–1648), Nurhaci's second son, participated in the Qing conquest of the Ming
 Jirgalang (1599–1655), Nurhaci's nephew, co-regent with Dorgon during the Shunzhi Emperor's early reign
 Ajige (1605–1651), Nurhaci's 12th son, participated in the Qing conquest of the Ming
 Dorgon (1612–1650), Nurhaci's 14th son, Prince-Regent and de facto ruler during the Shunzhi Emperor's early reign
 Dodo (1614–1649), Nurhaci's 15th son, participated in the Qing conquest of the Ming
 Yinsi (1681–1726), the Kangxi Emperor's eighth son, Yinzhen's competitor for the succession, expelled from the Aisin Gioro clan later
 Yinxiang (1686–1730), the Kangxi Emperor's 13th son, Yinzhen's ally
 Yinti (1688–1756), the Kangxi Emperor's 14th son, Yinzhen's competitor for the succession, purported rightful heir to the throne
 Duanhua (1807–1861), descendant of Jirgalang, regent for the Tongzhi Emperor, ousted from power in the Xinyou Coup in 1861
 Sushun (1816–1861), Duanhua's brother, regent for the Tongzhi Emperor, ousted from power in the Xinyou Coup in 1861
 Zaiyuan (1816–1861), descendant of Yinxiang, regent for the Tongzhi Emperor, ousted from power in the Xinyou Coup in 1861
 Yixin (1833–1898), the Daoguang Emperor's sixth son, Prince-Regent during the Tongzhi Emperor's reign
 Yikuang (1838–1917), descendant of Yonglin, Prime Minister of the Imperial Cabinet
 Yixuan (1840–1891), the Daoguang Emperor's seventh son, the Guangxu Emperor's biological father
 Zaiyi (1856–1922), Yicong's son, Boxer Rebellion leader
 Zaize (1876–1929), a sixth-generation descendant of the Kangxi Emperor, Finance Minister and Salt Policy Minister in the Imperial Cabinet
 Zaizhen (1876–1947), Yikuang's son, court minister
 Zaifeng (1883–1951), Yixuan's son, Puyi's biological father, Prince-Regent during Puyi's reign
 Zaixun (1885–1949), Yixuan's sixth son, Navy Minister in the Imperial Cabinet

20th century – present
 Pujin (溥伒; 1893–1966), better known as Pu Xuezhai (溥雪齋), guqin player and Chinese painting artist, grandson of Yicong (Prince Dun)
 Puru (1896–1963), Taiwanese artist and calligrapher, grandson of Yixin (Prince Gong)
 Jin Guangping (1899–1966), born Aisin-Gioro Hengxu, scholar of the Jurchen and Khitan languages
 Yoshiko Kawashima (1907–1948), born Aisin-Gioro Xianyu, a spy for the Japanese Empire during the Sino-Japanese War
 Pujie (1907–1994), Puyi's brother, member of the Chinese People's Political Consultative Conference, nominal head of the Aisin-Gioro clan from 1967 to 1994
 Qigong (1912–2005), artist and calligrapher, descended from the Prince He peerage
 Yuyan (1918–1997), calligrapher, distant nephew of Puyi
 Jin Qicong (1918–2004), Jin Guangping's son, historian and scholar of the Jurchen and Manchu languages
 Jin Moyu (1918–2014), born Aisin-Gioro Xianqi, Yoshiko Kawashima's younger sister, educator
 Jin Youzhi (1918–2015), born Aisin-Gioro Puren, Puyi's half-brother, nominal head of the Aisin-Gioro clan from 1994 to 2015
 Aisin-Gioro Yuhuan (1929–2003), sanxian player and Chinese painting artist
Huisheng (1938-1959), first daughter of Pujie, died of suicide.
Husheng (b. 1940), second daughter of Pujie
 Jin Yuzhang (born 1942), Jin Youzhi's son, governor of Beijing's Chongwen District, nominal head of the Aisin-Gioro clan since 2015
 King Pu-tsung (born 1956), Taiwanese politician, allegedly descended from the Aisin Gioro clan
 Aisin-Gioro Ulhicun (born 1958), Jin Qicong's daughter, historian and scholar of the Jurchen, Khitan and Manchu languages
Cecilia Aisin-Gioro, Paternal Granddaughter of the last Prince Gong in Qing Dynasty of China and Artist.
 Jin Xin (born, 1976), Daughter of Jin Yuzhang, the nominal head of the Aisin-Gioro clan since 2015. 
 Zhao Junzhe (born 1979), football player, descended from Boolungga, the fifth brother of Nurhaci's grandfather Giocangga
 Ariel Aisin-Gioro (born 1983), actress

Gallery

See also
Irgen Gioro
Manchu people
Later Jin (1616–1636)
Qing dynasty
List of emperors of the Qing dynasty
Manchu Restoration
Manchukuo

References

External links 
 

 
Qing dynasty
Individual Chinese surnames
Gioro clans